William Francis Newton Dunn (born 3 October 1941) is a British politician who served as a Member of the European Parliament (MEP) from 1979 to 1994, 1999 to 2014 and again from 2019 until the UK's withdrawal from the EU in 2020. He resigned from the Conservative Party in 2000 in protest of its euroscepticism and joined the Liberal Democrats.

Newton Dunn first represented Lincolnshire as an MEP (1979–1994), then the East Midlands (1999–2014; 2019–2020).

Early life
Born at Greywell, Hampshire, son of Lieutenant-Colonel Owen Frank Newton Dunn, OBE and Barbara née Brooke, he was educated at Marlborough College, Wiltshire from 1955 to 1959. After going up to read Natural Sciences (Physics and Chemistry) at Gonville and Caius College, Cambridge, he studied at Paris-Sorbonne in 1960, and graduated MA (Cantab) in 1963. He then received a tri-lingual MBA from the INSEAD Business school at Fontainebleau, where he studied from 1965 to 1966. From 1963 to 1979, he worked in industry in the United Kingdom.

Parliamentary career
Newton Dunn contested Carmarthen at the February 1974 General Election.

He was Conservative Party MEP for Lincolnshire from 1979 to 1994, during which time most European Parliament constituencies in the UK were single-member and the MEPs therein were elected by the first-past-the-post system. He stood for the new seat of Lincolnshire and Humberside South in 1994, but lost to Labour candidate Veronica Hardstaff by 83,172 votes (42.4%) to 69,427 (35.4%).

After a spell out of parliament, Newton Dunn was re-elected a Conservative MEP for the East Midlands in 1999, after the UK adopted systems of proportional representation generally rather than merely for Northern Ireland. He crossed the floor to the Liberal Democrats in 2000 because he felt that the Conservatives were increasingly negative towards the prospect of Britain playing a leading and positive role in Europe.

He was elected as a Liberal Democrat MEP for the first time in the 2004 election. He said he had the highest attendance record of all the UK MEPs when elected. He was re-elected in 2009.

Newton Dunn began to use the now much-used phrase "democratic deficit" in his pamphlet in the 1980s. This phrase first appeared in the manifesto of the Young European Federalists adopted at their congress in Berlin in 1977 (drafted by the future Labour MEP Richard Corbett).

In 2010, Newton Dunn signed the Spinelli Group manifesto in favour of a Federal Europe.

On 4 July 2012, he was the only British MEP to vote in favour of the Anti-Counterfeiting Trade Agreement (ACTA). Only 38 MEPs voted with him, while 478 voted against the treaty; this was the biggest defeat in the history of the European Union.

He stood for re-election in the 2014 election but was defeated.

Newton Dunn was Liberal Democrat parliamentary candidate in Hayes and Harlington in the June 2017 general election. In May 2018, he was elected to Richmond London Borough Council as a councillor for the South Richmond ward.

In the 2019 European Parliament election, Newton Dunn was first on the Liberal Democrat list for the East Midlands and was elected.

At the beginning of the Ninth European Parliament, he was the longest serving MEP (discounting periods outside Parliament) and the only MEP from the First European Parliament in 1979 (40 years previously) still holding a seat.

Personal life
In 1970, Newton Dunn married Anna Terez Árki; they have two children: Tom Newton Dunn, former political editor of The Sun newspaper and Daisy Newton Dunn, a TV producer for the BBC.

He and his wife divide their time between homes in Navenby, Lincolnshire and Richmond, South West London.

Newton Dunn is a Freeman of the City of London and a Liveryman of the Haberdashers' Company.

References

External links
 Bill Newton Dunn MEP official site
 Liberal Democrat MEPs
 Bill Newton Dunn profile at the site of the Liberal Democrats
 East Midlands Liberal Democrats site for his constituency party
 

1941 births
Living people
People from Hart District
People from North Kesteven District
People educated at Marlborough College
Alumni of Gonville and Caius College, Cambridge
INSEAD alumni
Conservative Party (UK) MEPs
Liberal Democrats (UK) MEPs
Liberal Democrats (UK) councillors
MEPs for England 1979–1984
MEPs for England 1984–1989
MEPs for England 1989–1994
MEPs for England 1999–2004
MEPs for England 2004–2009
MEPs for England 2009–2014
MEPs for England 2019–2020
Councillors in the London Borough of Richmond upon Thames
Politics of Lincolnshire